Thakkar is a Hindu Indian family name under the Hindu. Alternative spellings of the name include Thakker, Thaker,Thakkar, Thakrar and Thacker.  The surname is widely used in the state of Gujarat .

Society and culture 

Thakkars are mainly situated in the state of Gujarat in India. There are also thousands of Thakkars that reside in South Africa and East African countries, which migrated to the continent in the 19th and 20th centuries. Many Thakkar were also expelled from Uganda under Idi Amin's regime and moved back to India or the United Kingdom.

Notable people 
Ashish Thakkar (born 1981), British businessman
Bhavin Thakkar (born 1982), Indian cricketer
C. K. Thakker (born 1943), Indian judge 
Fagun Thakrar (born 1991), British actress
Jayaben Thakkar (born 1952), Indian politician
Natwar Thakkar (1932-2018), Indian social worker
Pankit Thakker (born 1976), Indian actor
Praful Thakkar (born 1940), Indian collector and writer
Rajesh Thakker (born 1954), British doctor
Rakhee Thakrar (born 1984]), British actress
Samay Raj Thakkar (born 1966), Indian actor
Shital Thakkar (born 1962), Indian television actress
Tanvi Thakkar (born 1985), Indian actress
Vaishali Thakkar (born 1964), Indian actress
Vinita Joshi Thakkar (born 1989), Indian actress
 Amritlal Vithaldas Thakkar, known as Thakkar Bapa (born 1869), Indian social worker

References

Indian surnames
Gujarati-language surnames
Hindu surnames
Vaishya community